The Australian Reform Party was a minor Australian political party that was registered federally from 1997 to 2002. It focused on a variety of issues, most prominently gun rights, and was associated with the right wing. Although approached by One Nation for preference deals in 1997, the party's leader Ted Drane claimed that One Nation leader Pauline Hanson had destroyed the chance to unite the right through unprofessionalism and prejudice. The party never received significant totals in elections.

References

Defunct political parties in Australia
Political parties established in 1997
Political parties disestablished in 2002
1997 establishments in Australia
2002 disestablishments in Australia